The Rockingham Railroad was a Southeastern railroad that operated during most of the 20th century.

The Rockingham Railroad was organized in 1910.
 
The Rockingham Railroad operated a 19-mile route from Roberdel, North Carolina, through Rockingham, to Gibson, North Carolina.

In July 1922 the Atlantic Coast Line Railroad acquired the Rockingham Railroad. The line was abandoned in 1968.

References

Defunct South Carolina railroads
Defunct North Carolina railroads
Railway companies established in 1910
Railway companies disestablished in 1968